The province of Batanes has 29 barangays comprising its 6 municipalities.

Barangays

References

Batanes
Populated places in Batanes